Helmut Senekowitsch (22 October 1933 – 9 September 2007) was an Austrian football player and later a football manager.

Playing career

Club career
He played for several clubs, including SK Sturm Graz, Real Betis and FC Wacker Innsbruck.

International career
He played for the Austria national football team and was a participant at the 1958 FIFA World Cup. He earned 18 caps, scoring 5 goals.

Coaching career
He later worked as a coach, one of his major achievements was helping Austria qualify for the 1978 FIFA World Cup, the first time Austria had qualified for the World Cup in twenty years. The Austrian team advanced to the second round in whose first match they fell 1–5 against Netherlands being coached by former international teammate Ernst Happel. Later he led them during the game dubbed The miracle of Córdoba, against arch-rivals West Germany, which the Austrians won 3–2 and which was Austria's first win against West Germany for 47 years,

He died in September 2007 after a long illness.

References

External links 
 Helmut Senekowitsch at eintracht-archiv.de 
 
 

1933 births
2007 deaths
20th-century Austrian people
Austrian footballers
Austrian expatriate footballers
Austrian expatriate sportspeople in Cyprus
Austrian expatriate sportspeople in West Germany
Austrian expatriate sportspeople in Greece
Austrian expatriate sportspeople in Mexico
Austrian expatriate sportspeople in Spain
Austria international footballers
1958 FIFA World Cup players
SK Sturm Graz players
First Vienna FC players
Real Betis players
FC Wacker Innsbruck players
Austrian Football Bundesliga players
La Liga players
Expatriate footballers in Spain
Austrian football managers
Grazer AK managers
1978 FIFA World Cup managers
Austria national football team managers
Athletic Bilbao managers
Panathinaikos F.C. managers
Olympiacos F.C. managers
Eintracht Frankfurt managers
AEK Athens F.C. managers
Cádiz CF managers
AC Omonia managers
LASK managers
FC Linz managers
FC Admira Wacker Mödling managers
First Vienna FC managers
Tecos F.C. managers
Panionios F.C. managers
Floridsdorfer AC managers
Expatriate football managers in Cyprus
Bundesliga managers
Super League Greece managers
Expatriate football managers in West Germany
Expatriate football managers in Greece
Expatriate football managers in Mexico
Expatriate football managers in Spain
Austrian expatriate football managers
Association football forwards
Association football midfielders
Austrian people of Slavic descent 
Footballers from Graz
People from Klosterneuburg